The 2005 Advance Auto Parts 500 was a NASCAR Nextel Cup Series stock car race held on April 10, 2005 at Martinsville Speedway in Ridgeway, Virginia. The race was the sixth of the 2005 NASCAR Nextel Cup Series season. The pole position was won by Scott Riggs of MB2 Motorsports, his first career pole, while Tony Stewart of Joe Gibbs Racing led the most laps with 247. Hendrick Motorsports' Jeff Gordon won the race. Sergeant Sean McGuire gave the starting command from Iraq.

Qualifying

Race 
Pole-sitter Scott Riggs lost the lead on the first lap after getting loose in turn 4, sliding up and colliding with Ryan Newman, allowing Jeremy Mayfield to take the lead. A tire on Newman's car popped, which brought out the first caution. Much of the early portion of the race was dominated by Mayfield, Tony Stewart, Bobby Labonte, and defending race winner Rusty Wallace. Meanwhile, Jeff Gordon fell behind three laps by lap 70 due to a loose wheel, but regained two laps, and via the beneficiary rule, got back on the lead lap after a caution on lap 276, while gaining the lead with 35 laps left. Sometime during the race, Gordon and Kurt Busch made contact, sending Busch into the wall. With three laps left, Travis Kvapil's car spilled oil on the track, bringing out the final caution. Gordon had a strong jump on the restart, and held off Kasey Kahne, Mark Martin and Newman to claim his 71st career win, his seventh at Martinsville, and his second of the season. Wallace closed out the Top 5, with Sterling Marlin, Ricky Rudd, points leader Jimmie Johnson, Elliott Sadler, and Joe Nemechek rounding out the Top 10.

Results

Standings after the race

References

Advanced Auto Parts 500
Advanced Auto Parts 500
NASCAR races at Martinsville Speedway